The Qin Empire II: Alliance is a 2012 Chinese television series adapted from Sun Haohui's novel of the same Chinese title, which romanticises the events in China during the Warring States period primarily from the perspective of the Qin state during the reigns of King Huiwen and King Wu.

It was first aired on Astro Wah Lai Toi in Malaysia in 2012. It was preceded by The Qin Empire (2009) and followed by The Qin Empire III (2017), which were also based on Sun Haohui's novels. The series began streaming as Qin Empire: Alliance on Netflix in 2017.

Plot
The series is set in the mid fourth century BC during the Warring States period of China. In 338 BC, Ying Si (King Huiwen) succeeds his father, Ying Quliang (Duke Xiao), as the ruler of the Qin state. After coming to power, he gets rid of Shang Yang, whom he has a personal grudge against, but retains the sociopolitical reforms implemented by his father and Shang Yang in the past two decades.

Ying Si soon receives an invitation to attend a ceremony in Pengcheng, where he and the rulers of the Qi and Wei states will declare themselves kings and recognise each other's legitimacy. (The rulers of Qin and Qi were previously dukes.) He survives assassination attempts and prevents rival states from forming an alliance against Qin. While he is away, the Qin aristocrats who have long opposed Shang Yang's reforms instigate the Yiqu state to attack Xianyang, the Qin capital, and attempt to use the opportunity to overthrow the king. However, King Huiwen remains cool-headed while dealing with the crisis, and eventually drives back the Yiqu invaders and eliminates the traitorous aristocrats.

Under King Huiwen's reign, the Qin state defeats the Wei state and seizes all the Wei territories west of the Yellow River between 330 and 328 BC. In 330 BC, the Qin state takes advantage of internal conflict in the Yiqu state to attack them and force them to surrender by 327 BC. In 318 BC, the Qin army successfully repels an invasion by a five-state alliance – Wei, Zhao, Han, Yan and Chu. Two years later, Qin conquers the Shu state to its south. In 313 BC, King Huiwen sends his chancellor Zhang Yi to sow discord between the Chu and Qi states. When King Huai of Chu learns that he has been deceived, he orders an attack on Qin but loses at the Battle of Danyang. With these victories, the Qin state gains control over the Guanzhong, Hanzhong and Bashu regions, and poses an even greater threat to its rivals in the east.

King Huiwen dies in 311 BC. He is succeeded by his first son, Ying Dang (King Wu), who wages war against the Han state and gains access to the Zhou dynasty's capital, Luoyang, after the Battle of Yiyang. In 307 BC, while visiting the Zhou royal palace in Luoyang, King Wu attempts to powerlift a ding as a show of his physical strength. Although he succeeds in his attempt, he suffers a fatal injury and dies shortly afterwards. His younger half-brother, Ying Ji (King Zhaoxiang), will eventually succeed him as the next king of Qin.

Cast
Main cast

 Fu Dalong as Ying Si (King Huiwen of Qin)
 Yu Entai as Zhang Yi
 Ning Jing as Mi Bazi
 Zhou Bo as Ying Ji
 Fu Miao as Wei Shu (Queen Huiwen of Qin)
 Jing Hao as Ying Hua - a great warrior and general of Qin
 Yao Lu as Gongsun Yan (Wei strategist) - also known as Xi Shou
 Li Li-chun as King Hui of Wei
 Yang Xinming as Hui Shi
 Yang Zhigang as Mi Yuan
 Zheng Tianyong as Zhao Yang - Minister of Chu
 Peng Bo as King Huai of Chu
 Chen Hao as King of Yiqu - Yiqu Hai

Other cast

 Sun Qiang as Gan Mao
 Sun Feihu as Gan Long
 Sun Ting as Bai Qi
 Zhang Zhenhua as Wei Ran
 He Ziming as Ying Dang (King Wu of Qin)
 Yang Fanghan as Su Xuan - an innkeeper in Xianyang
 Jiao Junxiang as Chen Zhen
 Liu Hui as Ying Zhuang
 Liu Zhaohong as Ying Ji
 Yan Zhen as Ying Ji (child)
 Ren Zhengbin as Yi Wei
 Luo Dayou as Su Xuan's assistant - waiter
 Zhan Hewen as Xiang Wen
 Ding Jialan as Xiaomei
 Lu Jia as Feng Gao
 He Yunqing as Du Zhi
 Peng Zhidong as Ying Qian
 Zhou Zhengbo as Sima Cuo
 Gao Haicheng as Zhao Yi
 Sun Min as Qin deputy emissary
 Jiang Yiming as Jian Ping
 Wang Caiping as Zhang Yi's mother
 Zhang Yongsheng as Ying Xin
 Yan Yichang as Qin noble
 Zhao Yi as 
 Wang Deshun as Long Gu - General of Wei and friend of Xi Shou
 Zhang Bo as Wei Si (King Xiang of Wei)
 Xue Fei as Wei princess
 Yan Pei as Wei Xiu
 Wang Yunsheng as Wei Meng
 Wang Jiahao as Wei Gao
 Wang Junpeng as Wei He
 Wei Hua as Zilan
 Xiahou Bin as Jin Shang
 Wang Daqi as Jing Cui
 Zhao Bo as Jing Xuan
 Zhang Xuan as Zheng Xiu
 Yuan Fei as Xiang Meng
 Cheng Guodong as Qu Gai
 Wang Di as Ji Hu
 Guo Jiaming as Lord Zhaowen of Zhou
 Chen Xiao as Mi Yan - son of Mi Bazi and King of Yiqu
 Li Baocheng as Yiqu prince
 Wang Ning as Han Peng (Marquis Wu'an of Han)
 Ma Weijun as Han Kang (King Xuanhui of Han)
 Liao Dongli as Gongzhong Chi
 Liu Chang as Crown Prince Huan of Han
 He Yongsheng as King Wei of Qi
 Tian Xiaobing as Tian Ying
 Liu Lei as Lord Mengchang
 He Yunqing as Kuang Zhang
 Li Mingming as Crown Prince Ping of Yan
 Doudou as Zhen'er
 Liu Tianzuo as King Wuling of Zhao
 Guo Chao as Zhao Gu
 Wang Yunsheng as King of Wushi
 Zhu Jun as Zhuang Zhou
 Yuan Fei as woman from Ba

Broadcasts

References

External links
  The Qin Empire II official page on CCTV's website
  The Qin Empire II official page on CTV's website

Television series 

2012 Chinese television series debuts
2012 Chinese television series endings
Television series set in the Zhou dynasty
Television shows based on Chinese novels
Chinese historical television series
The Qin Empire (TV series)
Television series set in the 4th century BC